Glaucocharis queenslandensis is a moth in the family Crambidae. It was described by David E. Gaskin in 1975. It is found in Australia, where it has been recorded from Queensland.

References

Diptychophorini
Moths described in 1975